Grajaú River may refer to the following rivers in Brazil:

 Grajaú River (Acre)
 Grajaú River (Maranhão)